Greece participated in the 2010 Summer Youth Olympics in Singapore.

The Greek team consisted of 28 athletes competing in 9 sports: archery, athletics, basketball, boxing, gymnastics, judo, rowing, sailing and swimming.

As the originator of the Olympic Games, the Greek flag entered the stadium first during the opening ceremony.

Medalists

Archery

Girls

Mixed Team

Athletics

10 Greek athletes will participate in Athletic event.

Boys
Field Events

Girls
Track and Road Events

Field Events

Basketball

Boys

Boxing

Boys

Gymnastics

Artistic Gymnastics

Boys

Girls

Trampoline

Judo

Individual

Team

Rowing

Sailing

Windsurfing

Swimming

References

External links
Competitors List: Greece

Nations at the 2010 Summer Youth Olympics
Greece at the Youth Olympics
2010 in Greek sport